Crypsedra is a genus of moths of the family Noctuidae. It consists of only one species:
Crypsedra gemmea (Treitschke, 1825)

References
Natural History Museum Lepidoptera genus database
Crypsedra at funet

Cuculliinae